(1548 – September 19, 1603) was a Japanese samurai of the Sengoku through early Edo period. He is believed to have been the illegitimate son of Matsudaira Hirotada of Okazaki, and therefore the half-brother of Tokugawa Ieyasu. He known as Matsudaira Saburo Goro Iemoto.

Family
 Father: Matsudaira Hirotada
 Half-siblings:
 Tokugawa Ieyasu
 Naito Nobunari
 Matsudaira Tadamasa (1544-1591)
 Shooko Eike
 Matsudaira Chikayoshi
 Natural Siblings:
Ichibahime (d.1593) married Arakawa Yoshihiro
 Yadahime married Matsudaira Yasutada

1548 births
1603 deaths
Samurai